"Holy War" is a song by the American rock band Toto. It was released in 2015 album Toto XIV. The song is written in E major.

Track listing

Credits

Toto 
 Keith Carlock – drums
 Steve Lukather – lead and background vocals, guitars
 David Paich – organ, piano
 Steve Porcaro – synths
 Joseph Williams – lead and background vocals

Additional musicians 
 Lenny Castro – percussion
 David Hungate – bass
 Jeffery CJ Vanston – additional keyboards

Releases 
 CD, Single, Promo, Sampler, Stereo – Frontiers Records, Scandinavia 2015.

Toto (band) songs
2015 singles
2015 songs
Songs written by Steve Lukather
Songs written by Joseph Williams (musician)
Songs written by C. J. Vanston